Green eyeshades are a type of visor that were worn most often from the late 19th century to the mid-20th century by accountants, telegraphers, copy editors, and others engaged in vision-intensive, detail-oriented occupations to lessen eye strain due to early incandescent lights and candles, which tended to be harsh (the classic banker's lamp had a green shade for similar reasons). Because they were often worn by people involved in accounting, auditing, economics, and budgeting, they became associated with these activities.

Green eyeshades were often made of a transparent dark green- or blue-green-colored celluloid, although leather and paper were used to make the visor portion, as well. One manufacturer, the Featherweight Eyeshade Company, described their eyeshade as "healthful, color peculiarly restful to the eyes". Green eyeshades are still on the market, typically sold as "dealer's visors". They retain some popularity in the gambling community.

Several individuals, including William Mahony, received patents for their eyeshade designs.

In popular culture 
The Society of Professional Journalists annually recognizes deserving journalists working in the Southern United States with its Green Eyeshade Excellence in Journalism Award.

The phrase "green eyeshades" can be used as a synecdoche for individuals who are excessively concerned with financial matters or small and insignificant details.

See also

Sports visor
Sportswear (activewear)
Banker's lamp

References

Hats